Jennifer Elizabeth Anderson is a British diplomat who has been minister counsellor and deputy head of mission at the British embassy in Ankara since 2017.

Anderson was educated at the Australian National University. She was with the Australian Office of National Assessments at Canberra from  1993 to 1995, then Harkness Fellow at the Institute of War and Peace Studies, Columbia University. She entered the Foreign and Commonwealth Office (FCO) in 1997. She was with the Central European Department 1997–2000; Resident Clerk at the FCO 2000–2001; with the EU in Brussels 2001–2003; Deputy Head of the Security Policy Group at the FCO 2003–2005; and Business Change Manager at the Information and Technology Directorate at the  FCO 2006–2009. She was High Commissioner to Botswana from 2010 until 2013 and head of the Counter-Terrorism Unit at the FCO 2014–2016.

References

1968 births
Living people
Australian National University alumni
High Commissioners of the United Kingdom to Botswana
British women ambassadors